Eugenio Garza Pérez (born 23 July 1996) is a Mexican-Columbian equestrian. He competed in the individual jumping event at the 2020 Summer Olympics.

References

External links
 

1996 births
Living people
Mexican male equestrians
Olympic equestrians of Mexico
Equestrians at the 2020 Summer Olympics
Show jumping riders
Sportspeople from Monterrey
Pan American Games medalists in equestrian
Pan American Games silver medalists for Mexico
Equestrians at the 2019 Pan American Games
Medalists at the 2019 Pan American Games